Radio Foorti is a Bangladeshi FM radio station. The station went live on 22 September 2006, and is currently available in Dhaka, Chattogram, Sylhet. Rajshahi, Khulna, Barishal, Mymensingh, Cox's Bazar, Bogura, Noakhali and Kushtia. It has popularized the role of radio jockey in Bangladesh.

Info 
Radio Foorti hit the airwaves on 21 September 2006, in Dhaka at a frequency of 98.4 MHz. It later changed the frequency to 88.0 MHz by September, 2007. It went on air in Chittagong in July, 2007 at 98.4 MHz and in Sylhet on February 1, 2008, at 89.8 MHz. At present Radio Foorti is transmitting at 88.0 MHz all over Bangladesh. Now Radio Foorti is broadcasting across ten cities and their adjoining areas. Radio Foorti has separate stations in Dhaka, Chattogram, Sylhet. Rajshahi, Khulna, Barishal, Mymensingh, Cox's Bazar, Bogura and Noakhali.

Radio Foorti celebrated one decade in the industry on 27 September 2016.

Radio foorti is also available to its worldwide listeners through the Radio Foorti App, available in the play store and the app store.
http://www.radiofoorti.fm/DownloadTheFoortiApp

References

External links 
 Official Website
 Radio Foorti on Facebook

Radio stations in Bangladesh
Mass media in Dhaka